Dorothy Davis may refer to:

Actresses
Dorothy Davis (1897–1993), Canadian actress, founder of Montreal Children's Theatre
Dorothy Davis (American film actress) (born 1914), in Night Fright etc.
Dorothy Patrick Davis (1921–1987), American model and actress best known as Dorothy Patrick

Writers
Dorothy Davis (1917–1995), British author of A History of Shopping
Dorothy Salisbury Davis (1916–2014), American crime fiction writer

Others
Hope Temple (Dottie Davis, 1859–1938), Irish songwriter and composer
Dorothy Spiers (born Dorothy Davis, 1897–1977), British actuary
Dorothy Davis (murder victim) (1920–1995), Australian murder victim
Dorothy C. Davis (born 1932), American horse breeder, based in Florida, owner of Timely Writer

Characters
Dorothy Davis, played by Janet Carroll in Henry Winkler's 1988 comedy-drama film Memories of Me

See also
Dorothy Davies (disambiguation)
Davis (surname)